The 2012 European U23 Judo Championships is an edition of the European U23 Judo Championships, organised by the European Judo Union. It was held in Prague, Czech Republic from 16 to 18 November 2012.

Medal summary

Medal table

Men's events

Women's events

Source Results

References

External links
 

European U23 Judo Championships
 U23
European Championships, U23
Judo
Judo
Judo, European Championships U23